Serine/threonine-protein kinase TAO2 is an enzyme that in humans is encoded by the TAOK2 gene.

Interactions 

TAOK2 has been shown to interact with MAP2K6 and MAP2K3.

References

Further reading